Juho Suomalainen (15 October 1868, in Vesanto – 16 April 1941) was a Finnish politician. He was a Member of the Parliament of Finland from 1907 to 1908, representing the Social Democratic Party of Finland (SDP).

References

1868 births
1941 deaths
People from Vesanto
People from Kuopio Province (Grand Duchy of Finland)
Social Democratic Party of Finland politicians
Members of the Parliament of Finland (1907–08)